Sara Zofia Egwu-James (born 10 June 2008) is a Polish singer and songwriter. She won the fourth series of the Polish talent show The Voice Kids and represented Poland at the Junior Eurovision Song Contest 2021.

Early life and education 
Sara James was born to a Polish mother Arleta Dancewicz, and a Nigerian father, John James. James has three siblings: Michelle James, John James Junior and Jakub Dancewicz.

She graduated from a primary school in Ośno, Poland, as well as a first degree music school in Słubice in 2022, where she learned to play the piano.

Career 
James started singing when she was 6 years old and took part in a Christmas carols festival in Szczecinek, Poland, which she won. In 2020 she came third in the World Talent Show and was awarded a Silver Microphone during the final show of Lubuski Song Festival Pro Arte.

In 2021, she took part in the fourth edition of The Voice Kids, in which she successfully passed through all the elimination stages on to the final, eventually winning by receiving the highest number of votes from the viewers. In September 2021, she participated in a Polish talent show , which selects the Polish representative at the Junior Eurovision Song Contest 2021. Having qualified to the final round, she performed her song "Somebody" for which she received the most votes from both viewers and jurors and went on to represent Poland at Junior Eurovision. 

On 19 December 2021, she performed at the Junior Eurovision Song Contest in which she came in second place with 218 points (102 points from online voting and 116 points from the jury). 

On 19 February 2022, she performed as a special guest in the TVP show Tu bije serce Europy! Wybieramy hit na Eurowizję, performing her song "Somebody" and Netta's Eurovision song "Toy".

In 2022, she auditioned for the seventeenth season of America's Got Talent. Her performance resonated with the judges and led Simon Cowell to push the Golden Buzzer, sending James directly to the live shows. She proceeded to make it to the finals but was eliminated when the top five contestants were announced. In 2023, She appeared on the America's Got Talent spin off, America's Got Talent: All-Stars.

Discography

Extended plays 

  (2021)

Singles 

 "" (2021)
 "" (2021)
 "" (2021)
 "" (2022)
 "" (2022)
 "" (2022)
 "" (2022)
 "My Wave" (2022)
 "Taka sama" (2022)
 "Bloodline" (2023)

References

External links
 Sara James on Junioreurovision.tv

2008 births
21st-century Polish women singers
21st-century Polish singers
Junior Eurovision Song Contest entrants
Living people
Polish child singers
Polish people of Nigerian descent
America's Got Talent contestants